The Otago Province was a province of New Zealand until the abolition of provincial government in 1876.
The capital of the province was Dunedin. Southland Province split from Otago in 1861, but became part of the province again in 1870.

Area and history
Otago Province was one of the six original provinces established in New Zealand in 1853. It covered the lower third of the South Island. Its northern neighbour was the Canterbury Province, and the boundary was the Waitaki River from the Pacific Ocean to its source in the Southern Alps, and from there a straight line to Awarua Bay (now known as Big Bay) on the west coast. The inland area of the Waitaki catchment was unexplored in 1853 and dispute later arose over which branch of the Waitaki should form the boundary. The boundary was delineated in 1861 as following the Ohau River to Lake Ohau and from there a straight line to Mount Aspiring and Awarua Bay.

Southland Province split from Otago in 1861, but became part of the province again in 1870. All the New Zealand provinces were abolished at the end of 1876.

Anniversary Day

New Zealand law provides an anniversary day for each province. Otago Anniversary Day is a public holiday each year on the Monday nearest to 23 March.

Superintendents

The Otago Province had five Superintendents:

Railways

The Province built the Port Chalmers Branch under the auspices of the Dunedin and Port Chalmers Railway Company Limited, and was built to the recently adopted national track gauge of 1067 mm (3 feet 6 inches), and it was the first line in the country with that gauge to open, on 1 January 1873. The first locomotive to run on the line was the E class Josephine, a double Fairlie steam locomotive, whose local popularity ensured she was retained beyond her retirement from service on the railways in 1917 and is preserved today in the Otago Settlers Museum in Dunedin.

When the Southland province amalgamated with Otago in 1870, the latter acquired the former province's railways - which were built to the standard gauge of 1,435 mm (4 feet 8.5 inches).

Legislation

 Otago Harbour Trust Leasing Ordinance 1862
 Education Reserves Ordinance 1864
 Education Reserves Ordinance 1865
 Harbour Reclaimed Lands Sale and Leasing Ordinance 1868
 University of Otago Ordinance 1869
 Dunedin Athenaeum and Mechanics' Institute Ordinance 1870, establishing the Dunedin Athenaeum and Mechanics' Institute
 Oamaru Racecourse Reserve Management Ordinance 1870
 University of Otago Endowment Ordinance 1870
 Blueskin Market Reserve Ordinance 1871
 Invercargill Athenaeum Reserve Management Ordinance 1871
 Northern Agricultural and Pastoral Reserve Management Ordinance 1871
 Lawrence Athenaeum and Mining Institute Ordinance 1872
 Lawrence Athenaeum and Mining Institute Reserves Management Ordinance 1872
 Oamaru Town Reserves Management Ordinance 1872
 Cromwell Athenaeum Ordinance 1873
 Dempsey Trust Ordinance 1873
 Invercargill Athenaeum Reserves Management Ordinance 1873
 Riverton Athenaeum Ordinance 1873
 Winton Racecourse Reserve Management Ordinance 1873
 Caledonian Society of Otago Incorporation Ordinance 1874
 Roslyn Institute Ordinance 1874
 Arrowtown Athenaeum Ordinance 1875
 Invercargill Athenaeum Reserve Management Ordinance 1875
 Riverton Athenaeum Reserves Management Ordinance 1875
 University of Otago Lands Trust Ordinance 1875

See also
Otago Gold Rush
Vincent Pyke
1853 New Zealand provincial elections

References

External links
 A page containing a map of the old provincial boundaries is available.
 The Seal of Otago

Provinces of New Zealand
History of Otago
States and territories established in 1853
1876 disestablishments in New Zealand
1853 establishments in New Zealand